The Killers (Egyptian Arabic: القتلة, translit: El-Qatala or Al-Qatala) is a 1971 Egyptian crime thriller starring Salah Zulfikar, Nahed Sherif and directed by Ashraf Fahmy.

Synopsis 
Adel Shawkat has a firm belief that his stepfather killed his father to marry his mother. He makes a strange deal with the unemployed Aziz Abu El Ezz, who wants to get rid of his wife Sawsan, to cash her life insurance policy. Adel pledges to kill Aziz's wife in return for Aziz killing his stepfather.

Main cast 

 Salah Zulfikar: Adel Shawkat
 Nahed Sherif: Sawsan Fahmy
 Adel Adham: Aziz Abu El Ezz
 Zozo Chakib: Adel's mother
 Gamal Ismail: Public prosecutor
 Emad Muharram: Emad Rashad
 Ashraf El-Selehdar: Hussein
 Hussein Ismail: Shawish

Production 
The film was produced and distributed by the state owned, General Egyptian Coropration for Cinema Production.

See also 
 Crime thrillers
 Egyptian cinema
 Salah Zulfikar filmography
 List of Egyptian films of the 1970s

External links 
 The Killers on IMDb

 The Killers on elCinema

References 

1971 films
Egyptian crime action films
1970s Arabic-language films
Films shot in Egypt
Egyptian black-and-white films
20th-century Egyptian films
1970s crime action films